The 20th edition of the annual Hypo-Meeting took place on 28 and 29 May 1994 in Götzis, Austria. The track and field competition featured a men's decathlon and a women's heptathlon event. Eduard Hämäläinen set a new meeting record with a total number of 8735 points.

Men's Decathlon

Schedule

28 May

29 May

Records

Results

Women's Heptathlon

Schedule

28 May

29 May

Records

Results

Notes

See also
1994 European Championships in Athletics – Men's Decathlon
1994 European Championships in Athletics – Women's heptathlon

References
 Statistics
 decathlon2000
 decathlon2000
 decathlonfans
 1994 Year Ranking Decathlon

1994
Hypo-Meeting
Hypo-Meeting